Concorde is an album by the Modern Jazz Quartet, recorded in New York on July 2, 1955, and first released that year as an LP, Prestige 7005, with liner notes by Ira Gitler. The album was reissued in 2008 as part of the Rudy Van Gelder Remasters collection.

The album is the first to feature drummer Connie Kay, who replaced Kenny Clarke in 1955. It is also the first Modern Jazz Quartet LP conceived from the beginning as a long playing record; previous MJQ recordings had been released as 78's, 10 inch 33's or reissues of these formats on a 12-inch LP. The liner notes acknowledge the additional playing time of the LP format by asking the listener to regard this album as a performance set "at one of America's leading jazz rooms".

Reception

Writing for AllMusic, Lindsay Planer described the transition between percussionists as "both smooth and sensible". He highlighted the interpretation of the songs in the Gershwin medley as "nothing short of definitive", saying that "All manner of post-bop jazz listeners will find much to enjoy throughout Concorde."

Track listing
"Ralph's New Blues" (Milt Jackson) – 7:08
"All of You" (Cole Porter) – 4:31
"I'll Remember April" (Gene de Paul, Patricia Johnston, Don Raye) – 5:09
"Gershwin Medley: Soon; For You, For Me, For Evermore; Love Walked In; Our Love Is Here To Stay" (George Gershwin, Ira Gershwin) – 7:54
"Softly, As in a Morning Sunrise" (Oscar Hammerstein II, Sigmund Romberg) – 7:54
"Concorde" (John Lewis) – 3:42

Personnel
Milt Jackson – vibraphone
John Lewis – piano
Percy Heath – bass
Connie Kay – drums

References

1955 albums
Cool jazz albums
Post-bop albums
Modern Jazz Quartet albums
Prestige Records albums
Albums produced by Bob Weinstock
Albums produced by Ira Gitler
Albums recorded at Van Gelder Studio